The Computer Science Ontology (CSO) is an automatically generated taxonomy of research topics in the field of Computer Science. It was produced by the Open University in collaboration with Springer Nature by running an information extraction system over a large corpus of scientific articles. Several branches were manually improved by domain experts. The current version (CSO 3.2) includes about 14K research topics and 160K semantic relationships.

CSO is available in OWL, Turtle, and N-Triples.
It is aligned with several other knowledge graphs, including DBpedia, Wikidata, YAGO, Freebase, and Cyc. New versions of CSO are regularly released on the CSO Portal.

CSO is mostly used to characterise scientific papers and other documents according to their research areas, in order to enable different kinds of analytics.  The CSO Classifier is an open-source python tool for automatically annotating documents with CSO.

Applications
 Recommender Systems.
 Computing the semantic similarity of documents.
 Extracting metadata from video lecture subtitles.
 Performing bibliometrics analysis.

See also

 Ontology (information science)
 Semantic Web
 Knowledge graph
 DBpedia
 YAGO
 Freebase
 Cyc
 ACM Computing Classification System 
 Mathematics Subject Classification (MSC)
 Physics and Astronomy Classification Scheme (PACS)
 PhySH (Physics Subject Headings)

References

External links 
 

Artificial intelligence
Computer science in the United Kingdom
Knowledge bases
Knowledge representation
Ontology (information science)